This is a list of all the United States Supreme Court cases from volume 545 of the United States Reports:

External links

2005 in United States case law